Pamela Begič (born 12 October 1994) is a Slovenian footballer who plays as a midfielder for Spanish Primera División club Sporting de Huelva. She has played for the Slovenia women's national football team since 2011 including during UEFA Women's Euro 2013 qualifying and UEFA Women's Euro 2017 qualifying.

Career
As a freshman for the Florida Gators women's soccer team in 2013, she was named to the 2013 SEC All-Freshman team. She joined the Florida Gators women's basketball team in her freshman year. In her junior year, she switched to one sport to focus on soccer.

In October 2015, she declined to play for Slovenia in two UEFA Women's Euro 2017 qualifying matches due to the difficult travel and the upcoming SEC tournament.

References

External links
 

1994 births
Living people
Slovenian women's footballers
Slovenia women's international footballers
Women's association football midfielders
Florida Gators women's soccer players
Florida Gators women's basketball players
People from the Municipality of Semič
Apollon Ladies F.C. players
ŽNK Radomlje players
Slovenian expatriate sportspeople in Spain
S.S.D. Empoli Ladies FBC players
Slovenian expatriate sportspeople in the United States
Slovenian expatriate sportspeople in Italy
Slovenian expatriate sportspeople in Cyprus
Expatriate women's soccer players in the United States
Expatriate women's footballers in Cyprus
Expatriate women's footballers in Italy
Expatriate women's footballers in Spain
Slovenian expatriate footballers